The St. Clair National Wildlife Area is a nature reserve located in the southwestern part of the Canadian province of Ontario, on eastern Lake St. Clair, west of Chatham.  It consists of two properties: St. Clair (244 ha) and Bear Creek (111 ha), about 16 km apart.

The cattail marshes and small ponds along the lake shore here are an important stopover location for migrating waterfowl, including large numbers of tundra swans. The marshes also provide habitat for
Yellow-headed blackbird
King rail
Black tern
Least bittern
This area also provides habitat for several turtle species including the eastern spiny softshell turtle and Blanding's turtle.

This site has been recognized as a Wetland of International Significance under the Ramsar Convention, and is classified as a National Wildlife Area.

References

External links
 Environment Canada: St. Clair National Wildlife Area

Nature reserves in Ontario
Lake St. Clair
Protected areas of Chatham-Kent
Ramsar sites in Ontario